James Patrick Howley (born 7 July 1847 near St. John's, Newfoundland and died 1 January 1918 at St. John's) was a naturalist and geologist, one of the first Newfoundlanders of European descent to visit the interior of the island of Newfoundland at the Bay du Nord River system.

Biography
Howley, son of Richard Howley and Eliza Burke was educated at Saint Bonaventure's College, St. John's, Newfoundland.

For a time he worked in the office of the colonial secretary, but his fame came when he participated in the geographical and topographical survey of the colony of Newfoundland. In the course of his surveying he met John Peyton, Jr., who along with his father had captured the Beothuk woman Demasduit. Peyton related to Howley many stories of the Beothuk. This started a life long fascination with the indigenous people of the island of Newfoundland, and Howley began collecting artifacts, oral history and documents which related to the Beothuk. His collection culminated in the publication of The Beothucks or Red Indians, which was published by Cambridge University Press in 1915. The book remains an important source on the Beothuk.

Howley was also a founding director of the Newfoundland Museum.

Legacy
In 2016, he was named a National Historic Person.

His son William served in the Newfoundland House of Assembly.

In May 2009 W.J. Kirwin and P.A. O'Flaherty published an edited version of Howley's Reminiscences of Forty-two Years of Exploration in and about Newfoundland.

See also
Beothuk language

References

 Biography at the Dictionary of Canadian Biography Online

External link

1847 births
1918 deaths
Newfoundland Colony people
Persons of National Historic Significance (Canada)